The 1996 UC Davis football team represented the University of California, Davis as an independent during the 1996 NCAA Division II football season. Led by fourth-year head coach Bob Biggs, UC Davis compiled an overall record of 8–5. 1996 was the 27th consecutive winning season for the Aggies. UC Davis was ranked No. 17 in the NCAA Division II poll at the end of the regular season and advanced to the NCAA Division II Football Championship playoffs, where they upset top-ranked  in Kingsville, Texas in the first round. In the quarterfinals, the Aggies upset ninth-ranked  at home. In the semifinals, they were defeated by sixth-ranked  in Jefferson City, Tennessee. The team outscored its opponents 369 to 240 for the season. The Aggies played home games at Toomey Field in Davis, California.

Schedule

Notes

References

UC Davis
UC Davis Aggies football seasons
UC Davis Aggies football